Villa Fallet is a traditional chalet located in La Chaux-de-Fonds, Switzerland designed and built by the eighteen-year-old Charles-Édouard Jeanneret (1887–1965), who later became better known as Le Corbusier. Jeanneret was teaching himself architecture by going to the library to read about architecture and philosophy, by visiting museums, by sketching buildings, and by constructing them. In 1905, he and two other students, under the supervision of their teacher, René Chapallaz, designed and built his first house, the Villa Fallet, for the engraver Louis Fallet, a friend of another of his teachers, Charles l'Eplattenier. The house is in the Style Sapin, the Swiss variant of Art Nouveau.

The chalet on the forested hillside near La Chaux-de-Fonds, is a large traditional chalet with a steep roof in the local alpine style, and is decorated with carefully crafted colored geometric patterns on the façade, with a design of triangular pine trees and pine cones.   The success of this house led to his construction of two similar houses, the Villas Jacquemet and Stotzer, in the same area.It It was completed in 1905. It is now recognised as a building of cultural significance in Switzerland.

References

Bibliography
 

Le Corbusier buildings
Villas in Switzerland
Cultural property of national significance in the canton of Neuchâtel
Art Nouveau architecture in Switzerland
Art Nouveau houses